Briggs Preparatory School is a private primary school in Trinidad and Tobago. It was established in 1975, by the late Esmee Briggs, a former teacher of Bishop Anstey High School, and her husband, the late Malcolm Briggs, a former clerk at the Red House. 

The school caters to children aged 3–11 at which point they enter secondary school. As well as traditional subjects, students study music, religious instruction, computing, art, and drama.

History
The school started with seven students, and was located on the corner of Edward and Gordon Streets in Port of Spain (near Bishop Anstey High School). Within a year, the school outgrew the space and moved to 167-169 Belmont Circular Road, opposite Providence Girls' Catholic School. Sometime after the transfer of the school from the Briggs family, the school was relocated to Cascade. The Belmont building is now owned by the Trinidad and Tobago Retired Persons Association and is leased to Belmont Boys Roman Catholic School. 

Esmee Briggs started the school with the help of her friends, Ms. Ethel Smith and Mrs. McCarthy. The pioneering members of staff were, Claudia Wilson (now Fingal) as school secretary and Rosemary Hezekiah (now Perkins) as administrator and bookkeeper. Along with teachers were Ms. Sergeant, Lucy Pierre, Angela Henry and Shirley Hinkson (now Baptiste). After the retirement of Mrs. Briggs as principal, Mrs. Marie-Michelle Conyette succeeded her as principal. 

The building at 167 Belmont Circular Road was a converted home, with a large lot behind, separated by a fenced-off stream. During July 1978, the yard was paved and the stream was covered by large wooden slats, allowing for more open space. Around 1980, the school constructed three additional classrooms, as the student population had outgrown the main building.

The leadership mantle has been handed over to Mrs. Claudia Fingal as principal. The Vice-Principal is Mrs. Karen Samaroo-Daniel and the Manager is Mrs. Sarah Wallace.

Curriculum
The school uses the North American elementary school curriculum, importing textbooks from the U.S. The Scott Foresman system was used extensively for math, science, reading and composition. As is done in the U.S, the books were loaned out to the students at the beginning of the school term and returned at the end.

Uniform
The school uniform has undergone changes over the years. Boys wore a blue patterned shirt  with jacket and grey short pants. Girls wore dresses of the same blue patterned material. The blue uniform pattern changed over the years, starting with a powder blue pattern with crisscross stripes. This was changed to a blue background with a small white uneven block in square patterns. At some time around 1984, the pattern changed to a thick, heavy squared darker blue due to unavailability of the old pattern. This remained the same until sometime in the mid 1990s when it was changed to the current light striped blue.

Houses
 Red - Flamboyant
 Yellow - Allamanda
 Purple - Petriya

When the students enter Junior 1 (equivalent to Standard 1 or first grade in the US system) each is assigned to a house and given a button to be worn on their uniform.

Events
The school celebrates events such as St. Nicholas day, when the school goes to the All Saints Anglican Church. In December of every year, there is a Christmas concert and party at the end of the first term. There is a Sports day, as well as a Speech day, that takes place every year, at which prizes are given to students based on merit. 

During their final year students of the standard five class attend outings, including a Tobago trip after writing the SEA exams. After Speech day, there is a graduation ceremony, at which the students get their certificates.

References

Schools in Trinidad and Tobago
Educational institutions established in 1975